Ormetica flavobasalis is a moth of the family Erebidae. It was described by Max Gaede in 1923. It is found in Bolivia.

References

Ormetica
Moths described in 1923
Arctiinae of South America